Mokrousovsky District is an administrative and municipal district (raion), one of the twenty-four in Kurgan Oblast, Russia. It is located in the northeast of the oblast. Its administrative center is the rural locality (a selo) of Mokrousovo. Population:  15,379 (2002 Census);  The population of Mokrousovo accounts for 37.0% of the district's total population.

References

Notes

Sources

 
Districts of Kurgan Oblast